is a 1933 Japanese silent drama film written and directed by Mikio Naruse. The film follows an aging geisha whose teenage son is ashamed of her profession, and their relationship with a young colleague of hers.

Plot
Kikue is an aging geisha. Her teenage son, Yoshio (Akio Isono), is ashamed of her profession, skipping classes and hanging out with a gang of hoodlums. A young colleague of Kikue, Terugiku, whom Yoshio feels close to like a sister, invites him to her parents' home in a fishermen's village. Yoshio witnesses a fight between Terugiku and her father, because she opposes her family's plan to sell her younger sister Misako to a geisha house like herself, and blames her father for his drinking and irresponsible behaviour. Later, Terugiku confesses to Yoshio her more than platonic feelings for him, and tries to get him to be more understanding of his mother. After a suggested suicide attempt by Kikue, Yoshio decides to return to his studies. When he tells the members of his gang that he wants to quit, he is beaten up and Terugiku injured with a knife. After her recovery, Terugiku leaves the city, hinting at having taken up a profitable occupation which she loathes, only to save her sister Misako from the same fate.

Cast
 Mitsuko Yoshikawa as Kikue
 Akio Isono as Yoshio
 Sumiko Mizukubo as Terugiku
 Reikichi Kawamura as Terugiku's father
 Tatsuko Fuji as Terugiku's mother
 Yoko Fujita as Misako, Terugiku's sister
 Tomio Aoki as Terugiku's brother
 Jun Arai as Kikue's patron
 Chōko Iida as landlady of the geisha house

Legacy
In his Critical Handbook of Japanese Film Directors, film scholar Alexander Jacoby described Apart From You, like its successors Every-Night Dreams and Street Without End, as a melodrama "of remarkable intensity", demonstrating "a considerable stylistic virtuosity". Naruse biographer Catherine Russell emphasised the "highly stylized editing" and "complex series of camera movements" of certain scenes, and the film's "pragmatic view of the geisha world". Keith Uhlich of Slant Magazine compared the film's "superficial stylistic flourishes" to Naruse's previous film No Blood Relation, adding that "it is nonetheless a much more focused and sustained work, bearing some evidence—via several beautifully visualized superimpositions—of the director's developing interest in character psychology."

Home media
In 2011, Apart From You was released on a five-film DVD set by The Criterion Collection's Eclipse label. Titled "Silent Naruse", it collected five silent films made between 1931 and 1934.

References

External links

Bibliography

1933 drama films
1933 films
Japanese black-and-white films
Japanese drama films
1930s Japanese-language films
Japanese silent films
Films set in the 1930s
Films set in Japan
Films directed by Mikio Naruse
Shochiku films
Films about geisha
Silent drama films